Alexander Marshall may refer to:

 Alexander Marshall (evangelist) (1846–1928), Plymouth Brethren evangelist
 Alexander Keith Marshall (1808–1884), US Representative from Kentucky
 Alexander Marshall (Australian politician) (1881–1966)
 Alexander Marshall (cricketer) (1820–1871), English cricketer
 Alexander J. Marshall (1803–1882), Virginia lawyer, businessman and politician

See also
 Alex Marshall (disambiguation)